Lisa Marie Wooding (born 1 December 1979 in Bishop's Stortford, Hertfordshire) is an English field hockey defender, who was a member of the England and Great Britain women's field hockey team since making her England debut in January 2001 against India.

References
 
    Profile

External links
 

1979 births
Living people
English female field hockey players
Olympic field hockey players of Great Britain
Field hockey players at the 2006 Commonwealth Games
Field hockey players at the 2008 Summer Olympics
Commonwealth Games bronze medallists for England
People from Bishop's Stortford
Commonwealth Games medallists in field hockey
Medallists at the 2006 Commonwealth Games